In mathematics, the double Fourier sphere (DFS) method is a simple technique that transforms a function defined on the surface of the sphere to a function defined on a rectangular domain while preserving periodicity in both the longitude and latitude directions.

Introduction 
First, a function  on the sphere is written as  using spherical coordinates, i.e.,

 

The periodicity in the latitude direction has been lost.

 

The function  can be expanded into a double Fourier series

History
The DFS method was proposed by Merilees and developed further by Steven Orszag. The DFS method has been the subject of relatively few investigations since (a notable exception is Fornberg's work), perhaps due to the dominance of spherical harmonics expansions. Over the last fifteen years it has begun to be used for the computation of gravitational fields near black holes and to novel space-time spectral analysis.

References 

Black holes
Boundary value problems
Coordinate systems
Variants of random walks
Equations of astronomy